Gustavo Adrián Melella (born 2 December 1970) is an Argentine politician who has been the governor of Tierra del Fuego Province since December 2019. He was previously mayor of Río Grande from 2011 to 2019. He is the first openly gay governor of an Argentine province.

He belongs to the FORJA Concertation Party.

Early life
Melella was born in San Justo, Buenos Aires Province, in 1970 and attended a Salesian school in Almagro. When he was 26 years old, he moved to Río Grande in Tierra del Fuego Province, becoming a philosophy lecturer at a Salesian School. In 2002, he was made rector.

Political career
From 2004 to 2005, Melella worked as the director of local development in the Río Grande municipal government and, from 2005 to 2011, he was secretary of production. In 2011, he was elected mayor of the city of Río Grande and was re-elected in 2015.

Melella was elected governor of Tierra del Fuego, Antarctica and Southern Atlantic Islands on 16 June 2019, defeating the incumbent Rosana Bertone in the first round. He was sworn in on 17 December 2019.

Personal life
Melella is openly gay. In a radio interview on 18 June 2019, he revealed he has been in a same-sex relationship for 16 years.

References

External links
Official website  (in Spanish)

1970 births
20th-century Argentine LGBT people
21st-century Argentine politicians
21st-century Argentine LGBT people
Gay academics
Gay politicians
Argentine gay men
Governors of Tierra del Fuego Province, Argentina
LGBT governors and heads of sub-national entities
LGBT mayors
Argentine LGBT politicians
Living people
Mayors of places in Argentina
People from La Matanza Partido
Radical Civic Union politicians